Jadehay sard (Translation: Frosty Roads) is a 1985 Iranian film by Massood Jafari Jozani. The film is based on the story "If Daddy Dies" by Reza Sarshar. In 1987 it became one of the first Iranian films to receive international attention when it premiered at the 37th Berlin International Film Festival.

Cast
Ali Nassirian as Moosavi
Hamid Jebeli as Rahman	
Majid Nasiri as Esmeil		
Esmail Mohammadi as Darvish Gorgali
Farzaneh Neshat Akhavan as Moosavi's Wife

Plot
Moosavi, a country schoolteacher, must undertake an arduous journey to fetch medicine for his village's sick. Accompanied by his student and a villager, he travels through a blizzard and is pursued by a pack of hungry wolves.

Awards
1986 Golden Plate Award for Best Feature Film at the Fajr International Film Festival

References

External links

Iranian drama films
1985 films
Films shot in Iran
Films set in Iran
1980s Persian-language films
Masoud Jafari Jozani